Percival Colin Montgomery OIS (born 15 March 1974) is a South African former professional rugby union player. When he ended his international career in August 2008, he held the all-time records for both caps and points for South Africa's national team, known as the Springboks. He is currently the highest scoring full-back in the history of international rugby.

Career

Montgomery was born 15 March 1974 in Walvis Bay, an enclave of South Africa that was transferred to Namibia in 1994. He attended one of the oldest schools in the country, South African College Schools, in Cape Town. He played the early part of his South African domestic career for Western Province in the Currie Cup and the Stormers in Super Rugby; before moving to Wales in 2002 to join Newport RFC, and joined the Newport Gwent Dragons after the 2003 reorganisation of Welsh rugby into a regional setup. 

He later spent the 2007–08 Northern Hemisphere season in the French Top 14 competition with Perpignan before returning to South Africa in June 2008. He then played for Western Province and the Stormers before ending his playing career in May 2009.

Montgomery earned his first Springbok cap against the British & Irish Lions in July 1997 as an outside centre. He played at the 1999 Rugby World Cup finals and had amassed 50 caps by the end of 2001. However, his Springbok career stalled after his move to Wales, since at that time players were only eligible for Springboks selection if they were playing domestically. After a change in policy, he was recalled by new coach Jake White in 2004. He was the leading points scorer in the Tri Nations in 2004 and 2005, and currently holds the record for the most points scored in a career by a Springbok rugby player. On 17 June 2006 against Scotland, he became the first Springbok player to reach 600 points in his Test career, and on 9 June 2007 he passed the 700-point mark against Manu Samoa. 

On 14 September 2007, Montgomery reached two major milestones in the springboks' second 2007 Rugby World Cup pool match against England. He became the first Springbok to score 800 Test points and, more significantly, he equalled Joost van der Westhuizen as the most-capped Springbok with his 89th appearance. He took sole possession of the Springboks caps record on 22 September against Tonga. He was the leading point scorer in the 2007 Rugby World Cup, playing a key role in the Boks' successful march to the Webb Ellis Cup.

Montgomery's 893 Test points give him well over twice as many points as the player in second place on the all-time Springboks points list, Naas Botha, who played in only 28 Tests compared to Montgomery's 102, since most of his prime years were in South Africa's era of isolation from world rugby.

On 13 May 2003 while playing for Newport, Montgomery was sent off for pushing a touch judge to the ground, and was later heavily fined and given a two-year ban, with 18 months suspended, for the offence of "assaulting a match official". He consequently missed the 2003 Rugby World Cup and returned to play in Wales in early December 2003.

He left Wales to join the Sharks for the 2006 Super 14 season where he played fullback.

For the 2007–2008 season, he signed for the French Top 14 club USA Perpignan and moved to France after the World Cup. In May 2008, he was signed by coach Rassie Erasmus to return to Western Province after completing his commitments with the Springboks. He was contracted to play for Province in the Currie Cup and the Stormers in the Super 14 to 2009 .

Montgomery became the first Springbok to earn 100 caps, being awarded a gold cap after their game against the All Blacks in Cape Town, losing 19–0.

Retirement
Percy Montgomery announced his retirement from international test rugby on 30 August 2008, after the Springboks beat Australia 53–8 in their last game of the 2008 Tri-Nations.

Post-retirement life

In May 2009, he rejoined the Boks, but this time in a coaching role as the team's kicking consultant in the run-up to the British & Irish Lions' tour of South Africa. Shortly after his appointment was announced, he confirmed his retirement as a player, indicating that he had planned to end his playing career at the end of the 2009 Super 14 season. Montgomery became involved in the tourism industry, and has also done charity work.

International statistics

Test Match Record

Pld = Games Played, W = Games Won, D = Games Drawn, L = Games Lost, Tri = Tries Scored, Con = Conversions, Pen = Penalties, DG = Drop Goals, Pts = Points Scored

Test tries (25)

Honours 
Western Province
Currie Cup: 1997, 2000, 2001

Sharks
 Super Rugby Runners-up: 2007

South Africa
World Cup: 2007
Tri Nations: 1998, 2004

See also
List of South Africa national rugby union players – Springbok no. 651

References

External links

Sharks profile
Newport Gwent Dragons profile
Percy Montgomery photos & statistics at sporting-heroes.net

1974 births
Living people
Alumni of South African College Schools
Dragons RFC players
Expatriate rugby union players in France
Expatriate rugby union players in Wales
Newport RFC players
Recipients of the Order of Ikhamanga
Rugby union fullbacks
Rugby union players from Walvis Bay
Sharks (Currie Cup) players
Sharks (rugby union) players
South Africa international rugby union players
South African expatriate rugby union players
South African expatriate sportspeople in France
South African expatriate sportspeople in Wales
South African people of British descent
South African people of Scottish descent
South African rugby union coaches
South African rugby union players
Stormers players
USA Perpignan players
Villager FC players
Western Province (rugby union) players
White South African people